The 1999 Rugby World Cup qualifying was held in several continental zones. Repechage was first introduced for the 1999 competition qualifying.

Tournaments
 Africa Qualification
 European Qualification
 Americas qualification
 Asia qualification
 Oceania qualification
 Repechage

Qualified teams

Automatic qualifiers
Only the tournament hosts, as well as the two finalists and the third-place winner from the previous Rugby World Cup, were automatically qualified for the 1999 Rugby World Cup.

 (Third place) 
 (Runner-up) 
 (Champion)
 (Host)

Regional qualifiers

Africa
 (Africa 1)

Europe
 (Europe 1)
 (Europe 2)
 (Europe 3)
 (Europe 4)
 (Europe 5)
 (Europe 6)

Asia
  (Asia 1)

Americas
 (Americas 1)
 (Americas 2)
 (Americas 3)
 (Repechage 2)

Oceania
 (Oceania 1)
 (Oceania 2)
 (Oceania 3)
 (Repechage 1)

References